Grapevine leafroll-associated virus (GLRaV) is a name for a group of viruses that infect grapevine.

Obscure mealybugs (Pseudococcus viburni) feed on the phloem of vines and woody-stemmed plants, especially pear and apple trees and grape vines. Some individuals are vectors for infectious pathogens and can transmit them from plant to plant while feeding; mealybug-spread grapevine leafroll associated virus type III (GRLaV-3), in particular, has wreaked havoc among the grapes of New Zealand, reducing the crop yield of infected vineyards by up to 60%.

The biggest problems in Grapevine Leafroll Disease are reduced grape yield, altered grape ripening, and altered grape chemistry. Leafroll viruses are associated with rugose wood condition of grapevine.

References 

Closteroviridae
Viral grape diseases